Iosco or IOSCO may refer to:

Organizations
 International Organization of Securities Commissions

Places
 Iosco County, Michigan
 Iosco Township, Michigan
 Iosco Township, Minnesota

Henry Schoolcraft neologisms

ja:イオスコ